KBRO in Bremerton and KNTB in Lakewood, both Washington, are a pair of simulcasting radio stations serving the Puget Sound region. KBRO broadcasts at 1490 kHz with 1,000 watts full-time while KNTB broadcasts at 1480 kHz with 1,000 watts day and 111 watts night. Both stations are owned by Iglesia Pentecostal Víspera del Fin.

History
KBRO, which signed on the air in May 1947, was the one-time sister station of the current KRWM during its early years as Bremerton's dominant community station, and KNTB, which signed on the air as KQLA, with an MOR/Talk format in September 1978, became simulcasts in 1998 as affiliates of the Triangle Radio Network, a service that targeted the LGBT community with a mix of music, Talk, and specialty fare. Controversy, a lack of support from advertisers and signal coverage would force the stations to drop the network and, in the process, be sold to its current owners, in September 2000.  After short terms of broadcasting oldies, and then a Hispanic Christian format, it settled into its current programming in 2005.  Later, KLDY (in Lacey-Olympia, Washington) and K221FJ (an FM translator in Tacoma, Washington) were added to the network.

The stations then broadcast programming from ESPN Deportes Radio, alongside Spanish-language broadcasts of the Seattle Mariners and Seattle Seahawks.

On March 30, 2015, KBRO and KNTB went silent.

On May 22, 2015, KBRO returned to the air with a simulcast of Spanish contemporary Christian-formatted KLSY 93.7 FM.

On November 10, 2015, KNTB returned to the air, also simulcasting KLSY.

External links

FCC History Cards for KBRO

BRO
Radio stations established in 1947
1947 establishments in Washington (state)